Great Artist may refer to:
 A Great Artist, a 2003 album by A Life Once Lost
 The Great Artist, a 2020 short film by Indrani Pal-Chaudhuri
 The Great Artiste, a USAAF WWII B-29 Superfortress bomber
 Illustrated Biographies of the Great Artists or The Great Artists, a 19th-century book series

See also

 Blush: The Search for the Next Great Makeup Artist, a 2008 competition show on Lifetime
 The Session...Recorded in London with Great Artists, a 1973 album by Jerry Lee Lewis
 Work of Art: The Next Great Artist, a 2010 competition show on Bravo